Hazelwood Parish, New South Wales is a Bounded locality of Brewarrina Shire and a civil Parish of Cowper County, New South Wales.

Geography
The topography of Hazelwood Parish is flat, and the parish is on the Mitchell Highway and the Main Western railway line, New South Wales, and the nearest settlement is Byrock, New South Wales.

Hazelwood has a Köppen climate classification of BSh (Hot semi arid).

References

Localities in New South Wales